Narthecoceros is a genus of moth in the family Gelechiidae.

Species
 Narthecoceros logica Meyrick, 1910
 Narthecoceros platyconta (Meyrick, 1905)
 Narthecoceros xylodes Meyrick, 1906

References

Gelechiinae